Peter Graham "Matthew" Corbett (born 28 March 1948) is an English actor, singer, comedian, magician, puppeteer, television presenter, and writer, best known for presenting The Sooty Show and later Sooty and Co. 
He is the son of Sooty's creator, Harry Corbett, and took over the show from his father in 1976. He retired in 1998.

Early life
Corbett was born in Guiseley, West Riding of Yorkshire, on 28 March 1948. In the late 1960s he had to choose another name when joining Equity, as there was already a Peter Corbett registered. He kept his surname and chose to go by the first name Matthew, retaining the name throughout his television career.

Corbett appeared in the Doctor Who serial The Dæmons (1971) as a character called Jones and was a regular performer in the Thames Television children's show Rainbow, where he sang and performed and wrote with Rod Burton and Jane Tucker as Rod, Matt and Jane, later on known as Rod, Jane and Roger and finally being better known as Rod, Jane and Freddy.

In 1976, Corbett left Rainbow to take over The Sooty Show from his father Harry, who was retiring (he made a special guest appearance on Rainbow with Sooty in the episode "The VIP"). Corbett retired in 1998 after 22 years, and chose Richard Cadell to replace him.

In January 2008, he reappeared on television, presenting Locks and Quays, a regional interest programme shown in the ITV Granada area (North West England), featuring a journey from the east to the west coast of England, along waterways such as the River Humber, the Aire and Calder Navigation and the Leeds and Liverpool Canal.

On Sooty's 60th birthday in 2012, he said that the bear was "in, or should I say on, the right hands".

Personal life
Corbett's great-uncle was the fish and chip shop chain owner Harry Ramsden, as revealed on Locks and Quays.

Corbett contracted COVID-19 in 2020. He nearly died from the disease, and had to spend 10 days in intensive care.

As of 2022, he and his wife now live in a retirement village in West Sussex.

Filmography

References

Further reading 

 Tibballs, Geoff (1990). The Secret Life of Sooty. Letchworth, UK: Ringpress Books. .

External links

1948 births
British magicians
British male comedians
British male singers
British male television actors
British male writers
British puppeteers
British television presenters
English magicians
English male comedians
English male singers
English male television actors
English male writers
English puppeteers
English television presenters
Living people
People from Guiseley
Sooty